Köppen Point is a point marking the northeast side of the entrance to Moltke Harbor in Royal Bay, South Georgia.

It was named for Professor Wladimir Köppen, a noted meteorologist and climatologist, who had recommended the establishment of a high level observatory near the base. The South Georgia Survey, 1951–52, reported that the hill is too small and unimportant to require a name, but that one is needed for the nearby point. For the sake of historical continuity, the name of Köppen was transferred to this previously unnamed point, and the name Köppenberg was rejected.

References

Headlands of South Georgia